Antonio Williams (born July 14, 2004) is an American football wide receiver for the Clemson Tigers.

High school career
Williams attended Dutch Fork High School in Irmo, South Carolina. During his career, he had 137 receptions for 2,458 yards and 23 touchdowns. Williams was selected to play in the 2022 Under Armour All-America Game. He committed to Clemson University to play college football.

College career
Williams earned immediate playing time his true freshman year at Clemson in 2022. In his first career game he had four receptions for 37 yards.

References

External links
Clemson Tigers bio

2004 births
Living people
Players of American football from South Carolina
American football wide receivers
Clemson Tigers football players